1997 in television may refer to:

1997 in American television
1997 in Australian television
1997 in Belgian television
1997 in Brazilian television
1997 in British television
1997 in Canadian television
1997 in Croatian television
1997 in Danish television
1997 in Dutch television
1997 in Estonian television
1997 in German television
1997 in Irish television
1997 in Japanese television
1997 in New Zealand television
1997 in Norwegian television
1997 in Philippine television
1997 in Portuguese television
1997 in Scottish television
1997 in South African television
1997 in Spanish television
1997 in Swedish television